Frederick George Johnson (24 April 1896 – 24 December 1956) was a former Australian rules footballer who played with Carlton in the Victorian Football League (VFL).		

Johnson coached the Corowa Football Club in the Ovens and Murray Football League in 1925. He also "coached" Ringwood Football Club during the 1925 Coreen & District Football League final series.

Notes

External links 
		
Fred Johnson's profile at Blueseum

1896 births
1956 deaths
Australian rules footballers from Victoria (Australia)
Carlton Football Club players